The Anglican Church of St Mary the Virgin, Ewell is the civic church of the borough of Epsom and Ewell in the county of Surrey in South East England.

History

Early history
There has been a church dedicated to Saint Mary the Virgin in Ewell since the 13th century, a board above the south door in the current building recording incumbents from 1239 to the present day. There were two reasons for the demolition of the old church (except for the 15th-century belltower, which still stands in the churchyard today): one was that the building was in such a parlous state of structural repair that it would come down whether demolished under control or allowed to collapse; another was that the incumbent at the time, Sir George Lewen Glyn (known to have been both Rector and Lord of the Manor simultaneously), resented his parishioners' carts all passing his rectory/manor house on their way to Sunday services, so had a new church built at the junction (one of two) of Church Road and London Road (both of which are arc-shaped) further away from the rectory.

Dedicated in 1848, the current building stands in a prominent position near the centre of the village of Ewell, on the old London Road. Designed by Henry Clutton, it was built in a simple, modest form of the Decorated Gothic style (apart from an ostentatious vaulted west porch, erected c. 1905) and faced with Swanage stone (not to be confused with Purbeck Marble) with Bath stone mullions and tracery. The North Aisle was enlarged in the late 19th century. The real glories, however, are inside. There is a fine marble pulpit, as well as the medieval font and chancel screen (which was extended somewhat to fit the larger chancel arch of the new church) from the old building.

Modern history
A fire in 1973, started by the explosion of the church's central heating boiler, destroyed the North Aisle and everything in it, including an organ built in 1865 by "Father" Henry Willis, except a print of The Light of the World by famous painter and local resident William Holman Hunt, who painted the original by the disused gunpowder mills in Kingston Road. The church was lucky enough to buy a similar organ (closely similar to the famous instrument in Truro Cathedral) from the church of St Augustine, Highbury, London, which was under threat of closure (see below).

Recently, a set of Stations of the Cross and Resurrection by the noted artist and parishioner Iain McKillop were dedicated for use at St Mary's, having been displayed at Lichfield Cathedral.

The "Father Willis" organ
The organ was originally built in 1889 by the organ builder Henry Willis for the Anglican parish church of St Augustine, Highbury. In 1975 there was a risk that the latter church would be closed—so, to protect the organ's future, they sold it to Saint Mary's, which had lost a similar instrument in a fire two years previously. However, in an ironic twist of fate, the church in Highbury was reprieved just days after the organ was removed and another nearby church, dedicated to St John, closed instead (whose rather smaller organ was installed at St Augustine's). The Ewell organ was installed in its new home by the Liverpool-based firm of Rushworth and Dreaper, but was left much as it had originally been built. Some of the organ's finely stencilled front-pipes (those that formed the front at Ewell) were painted gold, in accordance with the fashions of the time. However, a few stencilled pipes can be seen from a few angles behind these (see image 6). This instrument is, despite its prestigious origins (it was often regarded as the best of several similar instruments built in the Highbury area), comparatively little-known. The Vicar of Ewell, the Parochial Church Council and the Director of Music have decided that efforts should be made to redress this situation and, to that end, are to promote the instrument through a number of recitals and concerts, the particulars of which can be viewed here.

Stop list

See also
List of places of worship in Epsom and Ewell

Gallery

External links
 The official website of Saint Mary the Virgin, Ewell
 The organ's page on the official website of Saint Mary the Virgin, Ewell
 The Music Events page on the same site
 Specification of the first organ on the National Pipe Organ Register
 Specification of the current organ on the National Pipe Organ Register

1973 fires in the United Kingdom
Churches completed in 1848
19th-century Church of England church buildings
Burned buildings and structures in the United Kingdom
Rebuilt churches in the United Kingdom
Epsom and Ewell
Ewell
Diocese of Guildford
Henry Clutton buildings